Who's Back? is the eighth Japanese-language studio album (thirteenth overall) by South Korean singer BoA. It was released on September 3, 2014, by Avex Trax and compiles all of her singles released since her previous studio album Identity (2010).

Background and development 

After her 2009 English language debut BoA (2009) and her seventh Japanese album Identity (2010), BoA focused on releasing music in South Korea. In 2010, BoA released Hurricane Venus, her first Korean studio album in five years, followed by Only One (2012). In 2011, to celebrate 10 years since her Japanese debut, she released a video single, "Milestone".

Three of the songs on the album were originally released in South Korea as singles: "Only One" and "The Shadow" from Only One (2012), and "Baby You..", a Japanese version of BoA's song "Disturbance" (2013). All three songs featured writing credits by BoA herself. The majority of the songs on the album were released as Japanese singles, with four of the remaining songs being B-sides for these singles ("The Shadow", "Baby You..", "Close to Me", "Fun"), and a single new song, "First Time".

Promotion and release 

Many of the songs during their initial released had commercial tie-ups, such as "Woo Weekend" which was used as the 25th anniversary song for Disney on Ice Japan, and both "I See Mee" and "Milestone", which were used in commercials for Audio-Technica headphones. Several songs were theme songs for television programs: the song "Tail of Hope" was used as the opening theme song for the drama Hakui no Namida, while "Message" was used for the online Bee TV drama Love Message!'''s theme song. "Masayume Chasing" was used as an opening theme song for the first thirteen episodes of the seventh season of the anime Fairy Tail.

The song "First Time", the only new song found on the release, was used to promote Who's Back?'', and received a music video, featuring footage of BoA recording the song. The song had minor success, charting at number 76 on the Adult Alternative Airplay chart.

Critical reception 

CDJournal felt that the album, compiled of almost entirely previously released works, acted more like a greatest hits album than a studio album. The reviewers felt that the album was impressive in the wide range of genres and techniques used, going from "up-tempo dancable pop tunes"  to "melancholic medium ballads". For the individual songs, the reviewers felt that "Woo Weekend" had "relaxing light vocals" and a "comfortable, soft melody line", and praised her "poppy, colorful and innocent approach", and that "Only One" was a "perfectly expressed" ballad with a high level of skills. They praised the "fresh" summer feeling of "Tail of Hope", and felt "Baby You.." (i.e. "Disturbance") was a high quality, adult song.

Track listing

Charts

Weekly charts

Sales

Release history

References 

2014 albums
Avex Group albums
BoA albums
Japanese-language albums